This article summarizes the events, album releases, and album release dates in hip hop music for the year 2013.

Events

January
T.I. completed his 10-year contract with Atlantic Records, and is seeking a deal around $75 million for him and his Grand Hustle Records artists.
On January 20, 2013, Lupe Fiasco was removed from the stage by security after making anti-Obama comments in Washington D.C., during Obama's second presidential inauguration.
On January 23, 2013, Hit-Boy confirmed he signed with Interscope Records.
On January 25, 2013, Juelz Santana was sentenced to two years probation for threatening to kill his neighbor after his neighbor intervened and called the police when he heard Juelz assaulting his then girlfriend.
On January 28, 2013, Rick Ross crashed his car in Fort Lauderdale after his vehicle was shot at in a drive by shooting.
Jay-Z officially signed Timbaland to Roc Nation.
On January 30, 2013, Vado confirmed he signed with DJ Khaled's We the Best Music Group label.

February
On February 8, 2013, Paul Rosenberg confirmed Eminem's eighth album would be released in 2013, post Memorial Day.
Drake won his first Grammy Award for Best Rap Album at the 2013 Grammy Awards for Take Care.  At the same night, Jay-Z and Kanye West would each take three Grammys; two for Niggas in Paris and one for No Church in the Wild.
On February 18, 2013, Kollegah and Farid Bang topped the German album charts with their collabo album Jung, brutal, gutaussehend 2 selling 80,000 copies in the release week. It is the highest number for a hip-hop album in Germany for the last five years.
According to Billboard, Jay-Z and his Roc Nation imprint signed a “worldwide publishing administration deals with Warner/Chappell Music,” giving Jay-Z the rights back to his music post-Def Jam (The Blueprint 3, Watch The Throne) as well as future works, with most of his older catalog moving to the Warner umbrella within the year. A separate deal will put the past and future catalogs of Roc Nation's stable of artists on the publisher's roster immediately, including songwriters Philip Lawrence (Bruno Mars, Flo Rida, Cee-Lo Green), S1 (Kanye West, Beyoncé, 50 Cent), Carmen Key (Flo Rida, David Guetta), and British singer Rita Ora, among others.
C-Murder's appeal was rejected and he will remain in prison to serve out his life sentence due to a second degree murder committed in 2002.
Suge Knight has had two warrants for his arrest approved stating he can be arrested on the spot.
Ja Rule has been released from prison for his possession of an illegal firearm charge but still has time to serve for tax evasion.
Gunplay avoided his possible life sentence, and any jail time at all, due to the victim not cooperating and authenticating the video surveillance of him holding the victim up with a gun, and stealing a cellphone and gold chain.
On February 25, 2013, Atlanta rapper Young Vito, was acquitted of murdering 1017 Brick Squad rapper Slim Dunkin. However, he was given 25 years for aggravated assault and possession of a firearm.

March
On March 1, 2013, former No Limit Records rapper Mr. Magic and his wife were killed in a car accident in Mississippi, their daughter who was with them at the time survived the crash. Magic was 37 years old at the time of his death.
Gunshots were fired near French Montana's tour bus when he was parked and chilling with fans and rapper Meek Mill in Philadelphia, a 27-year-old male was fatally shot in the stomach and was rushed to the hospital being pronounced DOA.
Method Man announced on stage that the Wu-Tang Clan are working on a sixth studio album, that will be released this year to celebrate the 20th anniversary of the release of their debut album, Enter the Wu-Tang (36 Chambers).
On March 12, 2013 Lil Wayne suffered multiple seizures after shooting a music video in Los Angeles. He would be released later the same day. Three days later he would be hospitalized again after another seizure, Thus causing TMZ to state he was in a medically induced coma and being in critical condition. YMCMB members Mack Maine, Birdman, Jay Sean and a slew of industry friends such as T.I. would later deny these reports, and say he was in "good condition" and awake.
On March 14, 2013, Chief Keef was released from a juvenile detention center after serving 60 days for violating his probation.
On March 16, 2013, Veteran California rapper Tone Loc collapsed on stage after finishing a song at the Bridge Bash concert in Des Moines, Iowa.
Cleveland Rapper Machine Gun Kelly took home the 2013 MtvU "Woodie of the Year" award at the 2013 MTV Woodie Awards.
On March 22, 2013, Atlanta Police issued an arrest warrant for Radric Davis, aka Gucci Mane, after he apparently assaulted a soldier with a champagne bottle.
On March 29, 2013, Crypt the Warchild of OuterSpace announced he was diagnosed with cancer.
Diddy was announced to be the musical guest for WrestleMania 29 at which he would perform a medley of songs on PPV inside New Jersey's MetLife Stadium on April 7.

April
Tyler, The Creator released his 3rd studio album Wolf (Tyler, the Creator album)
Kid Cudi revealed that he left Kanye West's GOOD Music record label, on good terms.
On April 3, 2013, at approximately 2 AM, Power 105.1's host DJ Clue was arrested for drug possession and traffic violations.
Logic signs to Def Jam Recordings.
Kurupt announced that Tha Dogg Pound and Bone Thugs-N-Harmony are working on a collaboration album that will include all members of both groups along with Snoop Dogg and Soopafly.

May
On May 1, Chris Kelly of hip hop duo Kris Kross died at the age of 34.
On May 3, record producer AraabMuzik was shot in an attempted robbery in his neighborhood, and taken to the hospital where he is recovering.
On May 6, 90s hip hop group Naughty By Nature announced that they were splitting up.
On May 8, Gucci Mane announced Chief Keef was officially signed to his 1017 Brick Squad Records.
Kanye West announced that his sixth studio album Yeezus would be released on June 18.  J. Cole would move up the release date of his second album Born Sinner to that same date.
On May 23, it was reported that rapper Tim Dog might have faked his death in order to  not pay back money after being convicted of fraud.

June 
On June 2, Papoose "crashed" Hot 97's Summer Jam following Kendrick Lamar's set performing his single "Get At Me" with Ron Browz.
On June 9, 2 Chainz was robbed at gunpoint in San Francisco of his phone and wallet. Two days later while boarding a flight from LAX, TSA agents found that his checked bag contained marijuana and promethazine. He was arrested and booked on felony narcotics possession.
 On June 14, Kanye West's Yeezus leaked online in its entirety. It was the last of the June 18 album releases to leak as Born Sinner and Mac Miller's Watching Movies with the Sound Off had leaked earlier in the month.
 On June 16, through an advertisement for Samsung shown during the 2013 NBA Finals, Jay-Z announced that he will release a new album titled Magna Carta Holy Grail on July 4.
 On June 20, Dream Chasers Records artist Lil Snupe was murdered in Winnfield, Louisiana.
 Kanye West's sixth studio album Yeezus debuts at #1 on the Billboard 200 with 328,800 copies, beating out J. Cole's Born Sinner which debuted at #2 with 297,922 copies and Mac Miller's Watching Movies with the Sound Off which debuted at #3 with 101,795 copies.
 On June 22, Drake released four new songs, and announced the release date for his third album Nothing Was the Same.
 On June 28, Meek Mill was ordered to take etiquette classes in order to tighten up on his social media skills and better articulate his business dealings, after some of his fans threatened his PO on Twitter.

July 
On July 8, rapper Wiz Khalifa officially married his girlfriend Amber Rose.
On July 25, DJ Khaled publicly "proposed" to fellow Cash Money artist Nicki Minaj via MTV. He supported his offer with a 10 karat diamond ring from Rafaello & Co., valued at about $500,000. However it was later revealed it was all a ploy to debut his new single "I Wanna Be with You".

August 
On August 13, Big Sean released a leftover track from his sophomore album Hall of Fame, "Control" which features Kendrick Lamar and Jay Electronica. Kendrick's verse caused controversy as he "called out" J. Cole, Big K.R.I.T., Wale, Pusha T, Meek Mill, A$AP Rocky, Drake, Big Sean, Jay Electronica, Tyler, the Creator, and Mac Miller and called himself the "King of New York". Many rappers took offense to the lines without even being mentioned by name. Rappers including Lupe Fiasco, Papoose, Joell Ortiz, Cassidy, Joe Budden, A$AP Ferg, J.R. Writer, Mickey Factz, Mysonne, Bizarre, and Fred the Godson all released a response or a diss song within a week.
 On August 25, it was announced during the 2013 MTV Video Music Awards that Eminem would release the sequel of the commercial and critically successful The Marshall Mathers LP, The Marshall Mathers LP 2 on November 5, 2013.
 On August 26, Fat Joe reported federal prison in Florida to serve a 4-month sentence for tax evasion.

September 
 On September 16, Young Money Entertainment president Mack Maine was charged with sexual battery and assault in Oklahoma. According to court documents obtained by TMZ alleged that, Maine put his hand down one woman's shirt without her consent. Then while the women were trying to leave, Mack Maine reportedly held the door shut and also punched and broke one of the female's jaw.
 On September 19, it was announced that the first theatrically released Tupac Shakur biopic will begin production in 2014. 
 On September 19, Greek rapper Pavlos Fyssas who went by the stage name Killah P, was stabbed to death. Riots broke out throughout Greece due to the assumed political influences in the killing.
 On September 26, Chicago drill rapper LA Capone was shot and tragically bled out after leaving a recording studio.
 On September 27, former UGK Records artist, Ivory P was arrested on human trafficking and kidnapping charges, for kidnapping a 19-year-old woman to traffic out as sexual escort.

October 
 On October 8, Nipsey Hussle released his mixtape Crenshaw for free online, and in a limited 1,000 physical copies for $100 each. He sold out all the copies earning over 100,000 dollars in one day.
 On October 12, The Game following his official release from Interscope Records signed to Cash Money Records.
 On October 15, Future was dropped off of Drake's third headlining tour Would You like a Tour? after he made negative comments about Drake and his album in a Billboard interview. It was also reported he was demanding $1.5 million for lost wages, as he was set to get $40,000 per gig. He was subsequently replaced with Jhené Aiko on every date of the tour. Two days later, Future rejoined the tour and drops the lawsuit.

November 
 On November 7, Eminem became the first artist since The Beatles, to be the lead artist with four songs in the top 20 of the Billboard Hot 100 during the same week ("The Monster" at #3, "Berzerk" at #15, "Survival" at #16, "Rap God" at #17).
 On November 15, it was revealed that after Kendrick Lamar was named GQs "Rapper of the Year" and interviewed for the issue, Top Dawg Entertainment's CEO Anthony “Top Dawg” Tiffith took issue with the article and the interview, then pulling Kendrick Lamar from his performance at GQ's annual Man Of The Year party that took place on, November 12, 2013.
 On November 22, T.I. announced his signing to Columbia Records.

December 
 Jay-Z has the most Grammy nominations for the 56th Annual Grammy Awards with 9.  Kendrick Lamar, Macklemore, and Pharrell each have 7 nominations while Drake has 5 nominations. Also, T.I. and Kanye West each have 2 Grammy nominations.
 Eminem is now tied with the record of most Billboard Hot 100 #1's among rappers with Diddy and Ludacris with 5, with "The Monster" peaking at #1.
 On December 17, Pharrell signed to Columbia Records as a solo artist and announced that he would release his second album on the label during 2014.
 On December 20, Three 6 Mafia member and DJ Paul's brother Lord Infamous died from a heart attack.
 On December 28, Grand Hustle Records and Interscope Records artist Doe B was shot and killed in his home state of Alabama.
 On December 29, Waka Flocka Flame's little brother and Brick Squad Monopoly artist KayO Redd died from an apparent suicide in Atlanta.

Released albums

Highest-charting songs

Highest first-week sales

Highest critically reviewed albums

Metacritic

AnyDecentMusic?

See also
Previous article: 2012 in hip hop music
Next article: 2014 in hip hop music

References 

2010s in hip hop music
Hip hop
Hip hop music by year